Agladrillia callothyra is an extinct species of sea snail, a marine gastropod mollusk in the family Drilliidae.

It is the type species of the genus Agladrillia.

Description
The height of the shell attains 19.5 mm, its diameter 7.1 mm.

Distribution
This extinct marine species was found in Pliocene strata on Jamaica.

References

 W. P. Woodring. 1928. Miocene Molluscs from Bowden, Jamaica. Part 2: Gastropods and discussion of results . Contributions to the Geology and Palaeontology of the West Indies; Carnegie Institute Washington Publication, 1928

External links

callothyra